Australian Journal may refer to

 Australian Journal of Botany
 Australian Journal of Chemistry
 Australian Journal of Primary Health
 The Australian Journal of Physiotherapy
 Australian Journal of International Affairs
 Australian Journal of Management
 Australian Journal of Physics
 Australian Journal of Politics and History
 The Australian Journal of Anthropology
 Australian Journal of Linguistics
 Australian Law Journal  
 Australian Journal of Zoology  
 The Australian Journal